Segrià is a comarca (county) in the west of Catalonia, Spain, bordering Aragon. , over two thirds of its population live in the capital city of Lleida, which is also Catalonia's sixth largest municipality, and remains the most populated comarca in the Lleida province. It takes its name from the river Segre.

Municipalities

References

External links
Official comarcal web site

 
Comarques of the Province of Lleida